North Britain was a   Cargo ship that was built in 1945 by Lithgows, Port Glasgow as  Empire Cyprus for the Ministry of War Transport (MoWT). She was sold into merchant service in 1948 and renamed North Britain. In 1962, she was sold to Hong Kong and renamed Jesselton Bay, serving until 1968 when she was scrapped.

Description
The ship was built in 1945 by Lithgows Ltd, Port Glasgow. She was yard number 1005.

The ship was propelled by a triple expansion steam engine.

History
Empire Cyprus was launched on 18 April 1945, and completed in June. She was operated under the management of Charlton, McAllum & Co Ltd. Her port of registry was Greenock and the Code Letters GFWV were allocated. She departed from the Clyde on her maiden voyage on 23 June 1945, bound for New York, United States. Over the next six months, she would visit Port Said, and Suez, Egypt; Colombo, Ceylon; Calcutta, India; and Rangoon and Kyaukpyu, Burma.

In 1947, management was transferred to Hugh Roberts & Son, Newcastle upon Tyne. In 1948, she was sold to North Shipping Co Ltd and renamed North Britain. She remained under the management of Hugh Roberts & Son. On 28 January 1952, North Britain ran aground off Fiji. She was refloated later that day. In 1962, North Britain was sold to Kinabatagan Shipping Co Ltd, Hong Kong and renamed Jesselton Bay. She was operated under the management of United China Shipping Ltd, Hong Kong. She arrived on 2 April 1968 at Kaohsiung, Taiwan for scrapping.

References

External links
Photo of North Britain

1945 ships
Ships built on the River Clyde
Empire ships
Ministry of War Transport ships
Steamships of the United Kingdom
Merchant ships of the United Kingdom
Maritime incidents in 1952
Steamships of Hong Kong
Merchant ships of Hong Kong